The Ford Taunus 12 M is a small family car that was produced by Ford Germany between September 1962 and August 1966.

The Taunus 12M name had been used for the car’s predecessor and it would apply also to subsequent Ford models which is why the 12M introduced in 1962 is usually identified, in retrospect, as the Ford Taunus P4. It was the fourth newly designed German Ford to be launched after the war and for this reason it was from inception known within the company as Ford Project 4 (P4) or the Ford Taunus P4.

More unusually, the car was originally designed not for production in Germany but to be produced in North America and sold as the Ford Cardinal,  a home-grown competitor for the Volkswagen.  A last minute change of strategy saw the US production plans cancelled, and in 1960 Ford of Germany received a fully developed modern new design which they adapted for German conditions in order to replace their own by now badly outdated Ford Taunus P1.

North American design 
The 1952 Ford Taunus had received a stylish new body, but its engine was little changed from the (originally British designed) unit fitted in 1935 to the Ford Eifel and other underpinnings, including its rear axle and suspension, were little changed from those of the 1939 Ford Taunus G93A. By contrast, the P4, originally designed for large scale manufacture in North America, was technically innovative, featuring a newly developed compact V4 engine which would provide the basis for engines designed and produced by Ford of Germany for twenty years. The Taunus P4 was also a front-wheel drive design at a time when most other West German auto-makers except Auto-Union / DKW were still avoiding what was then seen as an unnecessarily complicated lay-out.

The decision, taken only after the new model had been prepared for production, not to build the Ford Cardinal in North America was the result of a review of “marketing opportunities” in the US market. In 1960 a prototype was delivered to Ford in Cologne.  The form of the model that emerged from the production line at Köln-Niehl two years later would be unchanged. The single all-red rear light cluster was seen as a tell-tale sign of the car’s US provenance at a time when independent (from brake lights) amber direction indicators were increasingly common on European cars. The dished steering wheel was another feature not normally found in European designs of the time.

Market launch 
The Taunus P4 came to market in September 1962:  it enjoyed a reasonably positive reception. It was obviously a modern car. Its North American designers had come up with a car that was far larger and more spacious than the standard set by the Volkswagen which by now dominated the small sedan class in Germany. Unfortunately P4s suffered from numerous different teething troubles, however, suggesting that adaptation of the car to German conditions may have been a somewhat rushed exercise. Over its four-year model life the Taunus 12M was produced at an averaged rate of more than 150,000 per year which made a useful contribution to the sales figures, but did very little to trouble the market dominance in the small car sector of the Volkswagen Beetle which at this time was held back chiefly by shortage of production capacity.

Engine and running gear 
The new V4 engine was mounted in the longitudinal, "overhung" configuration driving the front wheels as was first pioneered by Auto Union/DKW (and still used by Audi to the present day), meaning the engine was mounted far to the front of the car. It incorporated a balance shaft in order to try to compensate for some of the imbalance resulting from the unconventional positioning of the four crank pins in relation to the three bearings for the crankshaft. At this stage commentators nevertheless found the V4 unit "rougher" and noisier than comparable in-line units. The water pump and thermostat were housed in a sealed unit permanently protected by anti-freeze. The fan was thermostatically controlled which was still an unusual feature at this time. An eye catching feature introduced under the bonnet/hood in 1964 was color-coding on the rocker cover according to the engine type.  engines were coded green,  blue and  red. (The  version was replaced in the same year by the more powerful  unit.)

The modern compact V4 engine placed Ford of Germany in the hitherto unfamiliar position of setting the pace, and the company was able to sell the unit to other smaller European manufacturers. This was the engine that Saab later used for their V4 models after they abandoned their commitment to Saab two-stroke power. Ford's compact V4 engine also found its way into the Matra 530 sports car.

Power was transferred through a single dry plate clutch to the front wheels. The four-speed manual gear box featured synchromesh on all four ratios, and was controlled by means of a column-mounted lever. The universal joints necessary to combine power transmission with steering and suspension functions involved a combination of engineering and materials technologies which at the time was still regarded as "leading edge" although front-wheel drive applied to lighter cars with s lighter and less powerful engines had become mainstream in Germany over the three previous decades, following the pioneering application of the various technologies involved in Auto Union’s DKW badged small cars.

Along with the innovative front wheel drive, an idiosyncratic feature at the front of the Taunus P4 involved the front suspension arms which were connected to the engine/gearbox block, thereby fulfilling an unconventional supporting function. Above them, the transversely mounted leaf-springs were linked to a cross-member which was attached to the floor pan, and thereby part of the monocoque bodyshell. In the autumn of 1964 the various elements were rearranged and it became possible to soften the front suspension significantly: after this it was reported that the level of engine vibration reaching the driver was much reduced. However, these rearrangements also incorporated a weakening of the anti-roll control at the front of the car which now was in danger of leaning excessively when cornering. This effect was countered by the substitution of more firmly set up shock absorbers while two additional support connections were added at the front in order to make the steering and tracking more precisely controllable.

At the end of 1964 disc brakes replaced drums on the front axle. (Ford’s larger sister model, the Ford Taunus P3, had received this same upgrade the previous year.)

The Taunus P4 used a 6 volt electrical system which was by now becoming unusual in Germany, although at this stage the Volkswagen Beetle, too, had not yet migrated to a 12 volt electrical system.

Body 
Taunus P4s came as two or four-door saloon/sedans. A three-door station wagon was also offered:  this did not use the “Turnier” appellation from the larger 17M station wagon, although the “Turnier” name would later become used by Ford of Germany for all their station wagons. The station wagon also provided the basis for a panel van. In addition Ford offered a factory built two-door coupé which was in effect simply a two-door saloon/sedan with a shortened roof-line and a steeply raked rear window. The coupe provided exactly the same interior space as the two-door saloon/sedan up to the level of the car’s waistline, but head-room for those on the back-seat was severely restricted.

The rear light units each had an all-red cover and contained only two bulbs. One of the bulbs operated as a conventional brake light. The other rear light bulb contained two filaments, one of which came one with the light switch and the second of which flashed when the turn indicator switch was used, so following traffic saw just a single light becoming successively and rhythmically brighter and less bright when the car was about to turn. The effect will have been unremarkable to North American drivers, but triggered comment in Europe.  Here, even where single piece rear light units are fitted, rear indicator lights were and are normally included in their own separate part of the overall light cluster units.

Evolution 
The principal changes during the car's four-year production run took place under the skin, and received only muffled publicity since many involved suspension modifications which a slower and more careful development process might have made unnecessary.

A significant change in the light of subsequent developments was the transfer of production from Ford's German plant to a newly opened modern plant at Genk, in Belgian Limburg, an hour to the west of the company's Cologne head office. Initially the P4 was built exclusively at Ford's Cologne plant, but from August 1963 the P4 became Genk's first volume model and by the time the P4 was replaced three years later almost all the cars were being produced there.   The Genk plant subsequently became the lead plant and then the sole plant for production of the Ford Sierra before being retooled for the launch of the front wheel drive Mondeo.

Record breaker 
During 142 days in 1963 a standard specification Ford Taunus 12M travelled  round a disused race track at Miramas at an average speed of 106.48 km/h (66.18 mph).

Replacement 
The Taunus P4 was replaced in 1966 by the Ford Taunus P6 which followed broadly the same architecture but was slightly larger, and therefore even more spacious than the Volkswagen, Germany’s top selling small car throughout this period.

By the time of its replacement the Taunus P4 had notched up sales of 672,695 during a four-year production run.  The sales total was a significant improvement on the sales volumes achieved by its predecessor, but the overall market size was also growing during the early 1960s, and within its class the Ford 12M was pushed into third place on the domestic market by the reappearance in the segment of Opel, reviving with a new model the Opel Kadett which, like the Ford, appeared in 1962. The Kadett was replaced by an improved model after only three years by when the Kadett’s three-year production volume of 649,512 was less than 5% short of the total production achieved by the Ford over four years.

Technical data

References

External links 

 Ford-M-Modelle 1952–1972
 Ford-Oldtimer
 Ford-P3-Register

P4
Mid-size cars
Cars introduced in 1962
1960s cars